The Holiday Park Site, designated 20GR91, is an archaeological site located in Alma, Michigan.

The Holiday Park Site was listed on the National Register of Historic Places in 1985.

References

Further reading

External links
Holiday Park from the City of Alma

Buildings and structures in Gratiot County, Michigan
Archaeological sites on the National Register of Historic Places in Michigan
National Register of Historic Places in Gratiot County, Michigan